Keith Douglas Abbis (born 26 April 1932) is an English former professional footballer who played in the Football League for Brighton & Hove Albion, as a forward. He scored three league goals for Brighton, including two in a 3–2 victory over Middlesbrough in April 1960. He also played non-league football for clubs including Hitchin Town, Chelmsford City, Romford and Brentwood Town.

References

1932 births
Living people
People from Hatfield, Hertfordshire
English footballers
Association football forwards
Hitchin Town F.C. players
Brighton & Hove Albion F.C. players
Chelmsford City F.C. players
Romford F.C. players
Brentwood Town F.C. players
English Football League players